Tmesiphantes mutquina is a species of theraphosid spider in the subfamily Theraphosinae. It is native to Argentina.

Taxonomy
The species was first described in 2014 as Melloleitaoina mutquina. The specific name matquina comes from the Quechua language, meaning "a place or thing to smell", and is the name of the type locality, Mutquín. When it rains there, herbs release a pleasant smell. In 2019, it was transferred to the genus Tmesiphantes.

Characteristics
Tmesiphantes mutquina is only known from the male, which has a relatively straight embolus lacking any subapical triangular spine.

References

Theraphosidae
Spiders of Argentina
Spiders described in 2014